Sandeep Kumar (born 27 February 1975) is an Indian weightlifter. He competed in the men's featherweight event at the 1996 Summer Olympics.

References

1975 births
Living people
Indian male weightlifters
Olympic weightlifters of India
Weightlifters at the 1996 Summer Olympics
Place of birth missing (living people)
Commonwealth Games medallists in weightlifting
Commonwealth Games bronze medallists for India
Weightlifters at the 1998 Commonwealth Games
20th-century Indian people
21st-century Indian people
Medallists at the 1998 Commonwealth Games